Tokmar Castle is a castle ruin in Mersin Province, Turkey

Location

It is on a plateau at the southern slopes of Toros Mountains overlooking the Mediterranean Sea.

History
The castle was built by Byzantine Empire in the 12th century. Later on, it was captured by the Armenian Kingdom of Cilicia . In 1210, it was incorporated into the realm of Knights Hospitaller. It was later on captured by the Karamanids and finally by the Ottoman Empire in the late 15th century.

Construction
There  are sharp cliffs at the south of the castle . But other sides are quite unprotected. Thus there are defense towers at the north. Although most of the walls stand, the buildings in the castle have since been completely demolished.

Gallery

References

Forts in Turkey
Byzantine fortifications in Turkey
Ruined castles in Turkey
Castles in Mersin Province
Castles and fortifications of the Knights Hospitaller
Archaeological sites in Mersin Province, Turkey